Pratap Narayanrao Sonawane (born 12 December 1948) is a member of the 15th Lok Sabha of India. He represents the Dhule constituency of Maharashtra and is a member of the Bharatiya Janata Party (BJP) political party.

He is civil engineer by education and since 31 August 2009 member of Committee on Urban Development from Lok Sabha.)

He was elected as member of Maharashtra Legislative Council from Nashik Division Graduates' constituency for the term 6 December 2004 to 5 December 2010, but had resigned on 26 May 2009 due to election as MP for 15th Lok Sabha.

References

People from Maharashtra
India MPs 2009–2014
1948 births
Living people
Marathi politicians
Bharatiya Janata Party politicians from Maharashtra
Lok Sabha members from Maharashtra
People from Dhule district
Members of the Maharashtra Legislative Council